Justin Leroy Johnson (April 8, 1888 – March 26, 1961) was an American lawyer and politician who served as a Republican United States Congressman from California from 1943 to 1957.

Biography 
Born in Wausau, Wisconsin, Johnson graduated from the local high school and from University of Wisconsin–Madison, serving later in World War I. He then went to and graduated from University of California, Berkeley law school, practicing law and serving as city attorney in Stockton, California.

See also
U.S. Congressional Delegations from California

Notes

External links

Politicians from Wausau, Wisconsin
Politicians from Stockton, California
University of Wisconsin–Madison alumni
UC Berkeley School of Law alumni
Military personnel from Wisconsin
1888 births
1961 deaths
Republican Party members of the United States House of Representatives from California
20th-century American politicians